Alleluia is the third studio album by Catholic group, The Priests. It was released in 2016 on SWM7.

Track listing

Personnel

The Priests
Fr. Eugene O'Hagan – vocals
Fr. David Delargy – vocals
Fr. Martin O'Hagan – vocals

Additional musicians
 Moya Brennan – vocals on "Be Thou My Vision"
 Melisma – choir
 Slovak National Symphony Orchestra - orchestra
 Geraldine O'Dougherty - harp
 Jody Jenkins - percussion, piano, and keyboards
 Jonathan Hutton - piano

Production
 Frank Gallagher – producer and arranger
 Alastair McMillan – mix engineer
 Tim Young – mastering engineer at Metropolis Studios, London
 Kieran Lynch – engineer
 Richard Brown – assistant engineer
 Paul Campbell - additional programming
 Andrew Simon McAllister - additional programming
 Fergus Murphy - additional programming
 Matthew Sammon – pre-production engineer

References

External links
 The Priests Official Website

2016 albums
The Priests albums